Crocanthes monodesma is a moth in the family Lecithoceridae. It was described by Edward Meyrick in 1931. It is found on New Guinea. Lepidoptera and Some Other Life Forms gives this name as a synonym of Crocanthes fallax Durrant, 1915.

References

Moths described in 1931
Crocanthes